Liberal Arts and Science Academy (LASA) is a selective public magnet high school in Austin, Texas, United States. Although LASA is open to all Austin residents and charges no tuition, competition for admission can be strong and is contingent on submission of an application, prior academic record, and the Cognitive Abilities Test. LASA is often referred to as LASA High School.

LASA is often ranked as one of the best public schools in Texas, with a ranking of #4 by U.S. News & World Report in 2021.

History
In 1928, the Austin City Council approved a plan to segregate the city, effectively forcing black populations to move to certain areas of the city. After a national movement for desegregation of public schools began, AISD announced that it would begin efforts to desegregate schools, even though the school district continued to not allow busing. In 1968, the U.S. Department of Justice sued AISD for not integrating schools fast enough, and after many years of litigation, school boundaries were redrawn. LBJ High School opened in 1974 as a product of this reorganization of the school system. Enrollment at LBJ steadily dropped in the years after its founding, as white parents took their kids out of public schools. This prompted the AISD school board to take further action.

In an effort to stem White flight and create more diverse public schools, the LBJ Science Academy (SA) was created in 1985. SA classes were often shared with LBJ students. The SA was merged with Johnston High School's Liberal Arts Academy (LAA) in 2002, forming the Liberal Arts and Science Academy (LASA.) At this point, the school didn't have a distinct federal ID number, and thus was still considered a part of LBJ. In 2007, so that LBJ could receive a grant from the Bill and Melinda Gates Foundation and the typically lower performing students of the regular LBJ program could be granted automatic admission for the top 10 percent of students in their class, LBJ and LASA were split into separate schools. After the split, classes besides fine arts were no longer shared and teachers taught at either LASA or LBJ, but typically not both. Both schools continued to share fine arts and athletic programs until 2020.

Campus
LASA shared its campus with Lyndon B. Johnson Early College High School from its founding in 2007 to 2021. LASA was located on the second floor while LBJ was on the first floor. Melissa B. Taboada of the Austin American-Statesman stated in 2015 that some members of the Austin community "say the division [was] a constant blemish on the campus". As part of the Austin Independent School District's November 2017 bond, LASA relocated from the LBJ Early College High School campus to the Johnston Campus, which was previously occupied by Eastside Early College High School. The campus originally opened in 1960 as Johnston High School.  As part of the move, LASA chose a new mascot and school colors. The move took place in summer 2021.

Admission 
Admission is based on multiple criteria including grades, standardized test scores, essays, teacher recommendations, extracurricular activities, awards earned, a creative project, and an admissions exam (currently the Cognitive Abilities Test (CogAT)). The creative project portion was added in 2021.

Student body
, 21.3% of LASA students are Hispanic, 2.4% are African American, 44.2% are white, 25.2% are Asian, 6.9% are of mixed race, and 0.1% are Pacific Islander. 12.6% of LASA students are low income. The percentages of low income, black, and Hispanic students at LASA decreased circa 2010-2015. The 2021-22 school year saw record enrollment of 1,308 students. The student to body ratio is 1 teacher to 16.5 students. 

The school spends $3,665 per student for academic programs and $5,919 per student for all school functions, as of 2010.

School rankings
In 2022, U.S. News & World Report ranked the school #34 among the nation's best high schools and #4 among high schools in Texas. Niche's 2021-22 rankings placed LASA at #19 nationally, #10 among magnet schools, and #2 in the state of Texas. Newsweek's Best STEM Schools 2020 ranked LASA #6 nationally and #3 in Texas. 38 out of the 260 students in the LASA Class of 2018 were National Merit Scholars.

Traditions
The traditional "Senior Assassins" game was ended in 2014 after word of the game leaked to the media. The game began in 2006. Seniors would collect an entry fee, then chase each other in hallways during class breaks, trying to mark and "tag" each other with markers. A student who got marked was "dead." The last survivor claimed the cash prize. In 2013, students were injured in the hallway by running seniors. Walls were rammed and holes had to be repaired. The game finally ended that year when a male student chased a female into the women's bathroom and she complained. In 2014, the administration helped organize the game, setting additional rules. A parent alerted the media and the subsequent attention caused the district to order the principal to shut the game down. The game was restarted off-campus during the 2021-22 school year.

The official LASA mascot is the Raptor (short for velociraptor), decided upon via school-wide and alumni voting in February 2020. Prior to separation from LBJ, LASA shared LBJ's mascot, the Jaguar, in University Interscholastic League and other collaborative events across the schools.

Sports
LASA hosts the University Interscholastic League and intramural sports, including ultimate frisbee, golf, lacrosse, swimming, cross-country, and tennis. LASA split its UIL athletic teams from LBJ's in the 2020-2021 school year and formed its own football, basketball, and other sports teams. The school offers 16 UIL sports and 4 intramural sports.

Clubs and student organizations
As of October 2022, LASA offers 108 clubs and student organizations. These vary with each school year, and students may apply to create new clubs.

Debate 
LASA's debate team competes in Policy Debate. The team is nationally ranked and has qualified a team to the Tournament of Champions every year since 2016. In 2017, LASA had their first team on the Coaches Poll and they finished the year ranked 14th. The same team made it to octofinals of the Tournament of Champions that year and won the Texas Forensic Association State Tournament and the Harvard Debate Tournament.  In the final 2018 coaches poll, LASA finished the year ranked 15th in the country. 

In the 2020-2021 school year, the program was able to qualify 3 teams to the Tournament of Champions for the first time and a fourth team qualified via the at-large application process.  That year, the team also won the Bingham Policy Invitational. They are coached by Yao Yao Chen, a volunteer, who won the Kandi King Award for Coaching Excellence in 2021 from the Winston Churchill Classic Tournament. Chen also coaches debate at Kealing Middle School, whose students compete with the LASA debate team in tournaments.

In the 2021-2022 season, LASA won the Grapevine tournament and had 3 of the 4 teams in the semifinal round. They also won the Meadows Invitational and Alexandrea Huang and Samuel Church were the top 2 speakers, respectively. In the Texas Forensic Association State Tournament, LASA was 5 of the 19 teams that made it to elimination rounds and made it to the final round. At the Tournament of Champions, they had 2 teams in octofinals, the strongest performance in school history to date. In the last coaches poll that year, LASA was ranked 7th and 9th by the best debate coaches nationwide.

In the 2022-23 season, LASA won the Grapevine tournament for the second year in a row and Eleanor Barrett received the first-place speaker award. LASA also won the Westminster tournament and Greenhill Classic. At the St. Marks Heart of Texas tournament, the team won the Junior Varsity and Varsity divisions. In Junior Varsity, Anita Sosa and Bilal Faisal were the top 2 speakers, respectively. In Varsity, Alexandrea Huang, Sam Church and Eleanor Barrett received the top 3 speaker awards. On the first coaches poll that year, the team containing Alexandrea Huang and Sam Church were ranked 1st in the country, receiving 11 first place votes. The team of Eleanor Barrett and Lucy Loehr were ranked 6th.

Quiz bowl 
LASA's Quiz bowl club won national titles at NAQT's High School National Championship titles in 2013 and 2014, as well as the PACE NSC in 2014 and 2016. They have also had numerous top 4 finishes at both tournaments. As of 2022, LASA is one of two schools to have won two National Championship titles in the Varsity Division of the National History Bowl, along with Hunter College High School in New York City.

Science Olympiad 
Science Olympiad is also offered at LASA as a club. LASA placed in the top 3 in Texas every year from 2005 to 2021, including a streak of first-place finishes from 2007 to 2012. In 2015, the Science Olympiad team placed 3rd in Nationals.

Curriculum
To graduate with LASA's magnet endorsement, students must complete a minimum of 15 magnet classes, including a minimum three years of one Language Other Than English (LOTE), four years of English, three years of social studies, four years of math (or until they complete multivariable calculus), and four years of science. LASA offers Advanced Placement (AP) courses covering 30 Advanced Placement tests. Some AP courses, such as AP World History, AP English, and AP Physics, are mandatory for students at LASA. Students may begin taking AP classes in 9th grade.

Additionally, LASA offers specialized electives in various areas, such as How To Be An Adult, Amateur Radio (students may apply for an amateur radio license while taking the course), and a Modern Physics course. As of 2019, LASA has 20 elective science classes, which encompass astronomy, forensic science, and modern physics. Electives for humanities include creative writing, women's literature, amateur radio, and constitutional law.

Languages
LASA offers seven languages: French, German, Latin, Japanese, Spanish, Chinese, and American Sign Language.

Firefighting
LASA students are eligible to participate in the LBJ Fire Academy, a two year firefighting and EMT training course. The Fire Academy is a Texas Commission on Fire Protection (TCFP) approved firefighter certification program and a Texas Department of State Health Services approved EMT certification program. At the time of the program's founding in 2006, it was exclusive to LBJ students. The Fire Academy later expanded to allow students from 7 AISD high schools; LASA, Anderson, Austin, McCallum, Navarro, and Northeast. Students begin the program their junior year with firefighter training, before switching to EMT coursework early in their senior year. The classes are "double-block", meaning students attend the academy for two class periods (three hours) every other day. Additional skills training is completed in 8-hour blocks on certain Saturdays. Students complete their "ride-outs" with the Austin Fire Department.

Computer science
LASA{CS}, the computer science program at LASA, offers courses that cover Java, C++, data structures, Python, web and mobile applications, and digital electronics. Additionally, there is an independent study class to allow more advanced students to work on their own projects.There are also many computer science clubs, such as Programming in Practice and Cyberpatriots.

Publications
LASA publishes its own newspaper, The Liberator, as well as its own yearbook, Stetson. The Liberator was originally LBJ's newspaper; it was named after the abolitionist newspaper published in Boston in the 1800s. With the formal separation of LASA and LBJ in 2007, The Liberator became the official newspaper of both schools. LBJ withdrew from the joint publication at the start of the 2016-17 school year, due in part to the inclusion of an offensive graphic in the newspaper's February 2016 issue. However, the schools were already beginning to separate several courses and electives by that time. Stetson was previously LBJ's yearbook. When LASA and LBJ began to share a campus, LASA produced the book for both campuses. In 2016, LBJ began its own yearbook again, and LASA kept the Stetson name.

Signature courses
Students must take two "Signature Courses" in both their freshman and sophomore years. These Signature Courses are semester-long classes, with one period every day. Freshmen must take Introduction to Engineering ("SciTech") and Graphic Design and Illustration ("E-Zine"); sophomores take Introduction to the Humanities ("Great Ideas") and Biogeology ("Planet Earth" or "Plearth").

References

External links
https://www.lasacsclubs.com (LASA{CS}Clubs, associated student organizations to LASA{CS})
https://lasaliberator.com (The Liberator, LASA's newspaper)
http://www.lasarobotics.org (LASA Robotics team)
http://www.lasaquizbowl.org (LASA Quiz Bowl team)
https://www.lasascioly.com/ (LASA Science Olympiad team)
http://alleycatplayers.com (The Alley Cat Players, LASA Theatre)
http://lasavolleyball.teamapp.com (LASA Volleyball)
https://www.lasaswim.com/ (LASA Swimming and Diving)

Magnet schools in Texas
High schools in Austin, Texas
Austin Independent School District high schools
Educational institutions established in 2007
2007 establishments in Texas